Lawrence Rayford Howard (June 6, 1945 – May 11, 2019) was a Major League Baseball catcher. He played four seasons with the Houston Astros (1970–1973) and Atlanta Braves (1973). He died on May 11, 2019.

Baseball career
Howard attended Atwater High School in Atwater, California. He was signed by the Houston Colt 45s as an undrafted free agent in 1963. He spent seven years in the minors before being called up by the Houston Astros.

References

External links
Baseball Reference (Minors)
Baseball Gauge
Retrosheet
Venezuelan Professional Baseball League

1945 births
2019 deaths
Amarillo Sonics players
Atlanta Braves players
Baseball players from Columbus, Ohio
Dallas–Fort Worth Spurs players
Durham Bulls players
Florida Instructional League Astros players
Florida Instructional League Senators players
Houston Astros players
Leones del Caracas players
American expatriate baseball players in Venezuela
Major League Baseball catchers
Memphis Blues players
Moultrie Colt .22s players
Oklahoma City 89ers players
Richmond Braves players
Salisbury Astros players
Savannah Braves players
Statesville Colts players